Sankt Johann is an Ortsgemeinde – a municipality belonging to a Verbandsgemeinde, a kind of collective municipality – in the Mainz-Bingen district in Rhineland-Palatinate, Germany.

Geography

The municipality lies in Rhenish Hesse and belongs to the Verbandsgemeinde of Sprendlingen-Gensingen, whose seat is in Sprendlingen.

History
The typical Rhenish-Hessian wine village was known in the Middle Ages as Weiler Megelsheim (Weiler means “hamlet” in German) and had its first documentary mention in 1220.

Culture and sightseeing

Buildings
The municipality's landmark is the High Gothic Evangelical Johanniskirche (Saint John's Church) with an important Oberndörfer organ from 1793. This church was built as a pilgrimage church in the latter half of the 14th century by the Counts of Sponheim. It is consecrated to John the Baptist. Worth seeing are the church's mediaeval wall paintings and the modern church windows by Heinz Hindorf.

Sport
Up above the community, on the Wißberg, is a golf course.

Regular events
There are regular concerts at Saint John's Church.

The Sankt Johanner Jahrmarkt, a yearly market, goes back to the Middle Ages and is held on the weekend following Midsummer

Notable people

Erika Hofmann, German Wine Queen, 1954/1955

References

Further reading
 Heimatkundlicher Arbeitskreis des Volksbildungswerks St.Johann unter der Leitung von Ludwig Diehl:Sankt Johann - Erinnerung in Bildern aus alten Tagen, Geiger-Verlag, Horb am Neckar, 1989,

External links

 St. Johann in the collective municipality’s Web pages 

Mainz-Bingen